Enrico Rosenbaum (June 18, 1944 in Italy – September 10, 1979)  was an American songwriter, arranger, producer, guitarist and singer. 'Rico' was a founding member of Minneapolis-Saint Paul bands The Escapades (on New Year's Eve 1964-1965 the opening act for Chuck Berry) and later as The Underbeats, then renamed in 1969 as Gypsy.

External links
 Enrico Rosenbaum Biography Page at midwesttribute.com
 [ Gypsy] at Allmusic
 Gypsy 1970 at Billboard official site
 Gypsy at Whisky a Go Go

1944 births
1979 suicides
Gypsy (band) members
20th-century American male singers
20th-century American singers